The following is a list of the orders, decorations, and medals of Brazil:

National orders and decorations

National Orders

  National Order of the Southern Cross (highest National Order, for foreigners only)
  National Order of Merit (highest National Order that admits Brazilian Nationals to its ranks)
  National Order of Scientific Merit

Distinction granted by special statute

 Inscription in the Book of Merit of the Heroes of the Fatherland (Steel Book)

Orders and decorations granted by the Executive Branch, ranking below the National Orders

Military Orders

  Order of Defence Merit
  Order of Military Merit
  Order of Naval Merit
  Order of Aeronautical Merit
  Medal of Military Sports Merit
 Order of Intelligence Merit
 Order of Merit Military Public Ministry

Special Purpose Civilian Orders and Medals

  Order of Rio Branco (usually granted to personnel of the Brazilian Foreign Ministry, for achievements in diplomacy, or for foreigners)
  Order of Cultural Merit
 Educational Merit Order
 Order of Sports Merit
  Order of Medical Merit
  Maua Merit Medal (for entrepreneurs of the transport sector),
and others

Orders and Decorations granted by the Legislative Branch

  Order of the National Congress
 Chamber of Deputies Medal of Legislative Merit

Orders and Decorations granted by the Federal Judiciary or the Federal Public Ministry

 Order of Merit of the Labour Judiciary
  Order of Military Judicial Merit
  Order of Merit for Military Public Prosecution Service

Former orders
  Imperial Order of Christ
  Order of Columbus
  Imperial Order of Aviz
  Imperial Order of Saint James of the Sword
  Imperial Order of Pedro I
  Imperial Order of the Rose

Military awards and decorations

Decorations for military bravery
  Combat Cross First Class (Army)
  Combat Cross Second Class (Army)
  Navy Cross (Navy)
  Bravery Cross (Air Force)

Wound medals
  Blood of Brazil Medal
  Blood Cross (Air Force)

Wartime medals for operational service
  Campaign Cross Medal 1914-1918
 Victory Medal (War of 1914-1918)
 Medal of Distinguished Service (Navy)
  War Services Medal with 3 stars (Navy)
  War Services Medal with 2 stars (Navy)
  War Services Medal with 1 star (Navy)
  Northeast Naval Force Medal - gold (Navy)
  Northeast Naval Force Medal - silver (Navy)
  Northeast Naval Force Medal - bronze (Navy)
  Southern Naval Force Medal - gold (Navy)
  Southern Naval Force Medal - silver (Navy)
  Southern Naval Force Medal - bronze (Navy)
  Campaign Medal (Army)
  Italy Campaign Medal (Navy)
  Aviation Cross, ribbon A (Navy)
  Aviation Cross, ribbon B (Navy)

Outstanding service awards
  Distinguished Service Cross
  Medal of Victory
  Marshal Cordeiro de Farias Medal of Merit

Military good service awards
 Military Medal
 Troops Medal
 Good services Medal of the Military Police of the Federal District
 Medal of Merit for the officers and men of the Federal District Fire Brigade

Medals for contribution to national war efforts
  War Services Medal (Navy)
  Medal of the South Atlantic Campaign (Navy)
  War Medal

Military service medals
  Naval Medal of Distinguished Service
  Peacemaker Medal
  Santos-Dumont Merit Medal
  Marshal Trompowsky Medal
  Tamandaré Merit Medal
 Amazonic Service Medal
  Medal Bartolomeu de Gusmão
 Airborne Medal of Merit
  Joint Chiefs of Staff Medal of Merit

References

External links

Medalhas Secretaria-Geral do Exército.
Regula o uso das condecorações nos uniformes militares e dá outras providências